Silinae is a subfamily of soldier beetles in the family Cantharidae. There are about 6 genera and more than 180 described species in Silinae.

Genera
These six genera belong to the subfamily Silinae:
 Discodon Gorham, 1881
 Ditemnus LeConte, 1861
 Plectonotum Gorham, 1891
 Polemius LeConte, 1851
 Silis Charpentier, 1825
 Tytthonyx LeConte, 1851

References

Further reading

External links

 

Cantharidae
Articles created by Qbugbot